The Shaanxi KJ-500 (Chinese: 空警-500; pinyin: Kōngjǐng Wǔbǎi; literally: "Air Warning 500") is a third-generation airborne early warning and control (AEW&C) aircraft used by the Chinese People's Liberation Army Air Force. It was built by Shaanxi Aircraft Corporation, and is based on the Y-9 airframe.

Development
Since the beginning of the 21st century, the detection range and the accuracy of airborne radars have been increasing, and fighters equipped with various types of air-to-air missiles and low-altitude cruise missiles continue to improve in performance, creating a demand for a more capable AEW&C. To address the above issues, China started the development of the KJ-500, its third AEW&C, in the late 2000s. The KJ-500 was required to have three important features, which are good detection capability, good identification ability, and quick responsiveness. The KJ-500 was also required to be the core force of the information combat system, its equipped technology has four major characteristics, which are networking, multi-functionality, high-integration, and lightweight.

The aircraft carries a fixed dorsal radome containing three AESA radar arrays for 360-degree coverage, and is said to be more efficient than the two-planar 'balance beam' array design used on the earlier KJ-200. Production of older AEW&C types reportedly ceased production in 2018 in response to the KJ-500 reaching full operational capability.

Variants
KJ-500 Base variant
KJ-500A Improved variant with an aerial refueling probe. Debut in Zhuhai Airshow 2022.

Operators
 People's Republic of China
 People's Liberation Army Air Force - 11 KJ-500
 People's Liberation Army Naval Air Force - 14+ KJ-500H

Specifications
Limited performance parameters of KJ-500 have been published as follows:
 Max speed (km/h): 550
 Max range (km): 5700
 Max endurance (h): 12
 Max takeoff weight(tons): 77
 Range against fighter sized targets (km): 470

References

AWACS aircraft
2010s Chinese military aircraft
Aircraft first flown in 2013
High-wing aircraft
Four-engined turboprop aircraft